Prisoje is a village in the municipalities of Foča, Republika Srpska and Foča-Ustikolina, Bosnia and Herzegovina.

Demographics 
According to the 2013 census, its population was 19, with 6 of them living in the Republika Srpska part, and 13 in the Foča-Ustikolina part.

References

Populated places in Foča
Populated places in Foča-Ustikolina